Circoxena ditrocha is a species of moth in the family Blastodacnidae. This species is endemic to New Zealand and has been collected on both the North and South Islands. The habitat of this species is on the edges of native forest or scrub and it may be associated withPseudopanax arboreus. As at 2000 the host species of this moth is unknown but it has been hypothesised that the larvae are seed borers. Adults are on the wing in December to March. It is classified as "At Risk, Naturally Uncommon" by the Department of Conservation.

Taxonomy
 
This species was first described by Edward Meyrick in 1916 using a specimen collected by George Hudson at Wainuiomata in December. Hudson discussed and illustrated the species in his 1928 publication The butterflies and moths of New Zealand. In 1973 John S. Dugdale discussed the species and illustrated the wing venation as well as the genitalia of both the male and female. The holotype specimen is held at the Natural History Museum, London.

Description 

Meyrick described this species as follows:
Alfred Philpott studied and described the male genitalia of the species in 1927.

Distribution
This species is endemic to New Zealand. It has been found from Auckland to Invercargill.

Biology and behaviour 
The adults of this species have been found on the wing in December and March. Hudson noted that C. ditrocha was a sluggish flyer and could be collected by sweeping foliage.

Host plants and habitat
The host plants of the larvae of this moth are unknown, but the larva may be a seed borer. Adults of this species prefer habitat at the edges of forest or scrub and appear to be associated with Pseudopanax arboreus.

Conservation Status 
This species has been classified as having the "At Risk, Naturally Uncommon" conservation status under the New Zealand Threat Classification System.

References

External links

Photo of Female holotype specimen held at the Natural History Museum, London
Specimens held at the Auckland museum

Cosmopterigidae
Moths of New Zealand
Endemic fauna of New Zealand
Moths described in 1916
Taxa named by Edward Meyrick
Endangered biota of New Zealand
Endemic moths of New Zealand